Egorye is a rural locality (a selo) in Botanovskoye Rural Settlement, Mezhdurechensky District, Vologda Oblast, Russia. The population was 4 as of 2002.

Geography 
Egorye is located 44 km southwest of Shuyskoye (the district's administrative centre) by road. Plyusnino is the nearest rural locality.

References 

Rural localities in Mezhdurechensky District, Vologda Oblast